Fritz Koenig (20 June 1924 – 22 February 2017) was one of the most important international German sculptors of the 20th century.

Koenig's main work and most famous work is The Sphere. The world's largest bronze sculpture of modern times once stood on the plaza beneath the two World Trade Center towers in Lower Manhattan until the terrorist attacks on September 11, 2001. The artifact, weighing more than 20 tons, was the only remaining work of art to be recovered largely intact from the ruins of the collapsed twin towers after the attacks. With its damage deliberately left unrepaired, the sculpture now stands in Manhattan's Liberty Park as a memorial to the victims of the September 11 attacks. 

Koenig's oeuvre includes other works, including other memorials. Numerous works by Koenig and his renowned collections with artifacts from antiquity to the 20th century are located in the Koenigmuseum in Landshut, which he designed and established by the Fritz and Maria Koenig Foundation.

Biography
Born in Würzburg, Koenig's family moved to the Bavarian community of Landshut in 1930, when he was six years old. He entered the Oberrealschule (today the Hans-Leinberger-Gymnasium) in 1942, and in the same year, he was drafted into the Wehrmacht and sent to the Eastern Front, where he was captured and taken as a prisoner of war. 

In the years after World War II, he studied art at the Academy of Fine Arts in Munich starting in 1946 and graduating in 1952. In 1951 he studied in Paris on a scholarship. In 1957 Koenig was selected to receive a scholarship from the Villa Massimo in Rome. In 1958 Koenig presented at the XXIX. Biennale in Venice and designed the German pavilion at the world exhibition Expo 58 in Brussels with his art. In 1959 Koenig was able to exhibit at the II. documenta in Kassel. In addition, the Günther Franke gallery in Munich presented Koenig's first solo exhibition. Also in the same year, 1959, Koenig married his wife Maria, who was born in Landshut (* June 4, 1921 - † October 1, 2010). In 1960 Koenig and his wife bought an agricultural property in the Altdorf district of Ganslberg near Landshut. In 1961 a house, studio and stables were built according to his ideas. Rural life made it possible for the passionate rider and horse lover to set up his own thoroughbred Arabian breed, which achieved worldwide fame and was also of great importance for his artistic work.

Koenig achieved his final international breakthrough in 1961 with a solo exhibition at the Staempfli Gallery in New York. Exhibitions at documenta III and XXXII. Bienniale followed in 1964. In the same year he was appointed professor for sculptural design at the Technical University of Munich, where he participated in the training of architects until 1992.  From 1967 to 1971 Koenig created his main work that led him to world fame: At the behest of the World Trade Center architect Minoru Yamasaki and on behalf of the Port Authority of New York and New Jersey, Koenig created a fountain system with the bronze sculpture Große Kugelkaryatid N.Y. (later known as The Sphere for the World Trade Center in New York City, which was still under construction.

Over the decades, Fritz Koenig created a diverse work that he was able to keep in representative casts in his spacious country estate in Ganslberg. In addition, the sculptor owned many works of art from a wide variety of cultures and periods from antiquity to the 20th century, the quality and diversity of which testify to the lifelong passion for collecting. Koenig's collection focused on a world-renowned collection of African works of art.

Koenig was a board member of the German Association of Artists from 1961 to 1972. Fritz Koenig was also the recipient of numerous awards, including the Bavarian Maximilian Order for Science and Art and the Order of Merit of the Federal Republic of Germany. Koenig died on February 22, 2017, at the age of 92 on his country estate in Ganslberg.

Work

In his work, Koenig was primarily concerned with the elementary "existence" of humans and animals in the area of tension between religiosity and mythology. The human being in the fragility of his existence, in the field of tension between love, death and impermanence, was another major leitmotif of Fritz Koenig's work. The combination of geometric forms like cuboids, spheres  and bodies and limbs of cylinders to create new, organic-looking objects cast in metal made Koenig known in the early 1950s.

Major works
 The Sphere, 1969–71, now displayed in Liberty Park in New York City.
 German memorial at Mauthausen concentration camp, 1983
 Memorial to victims of the Munich massacre during the 1972 Summer Olympics.
 Permanent exhibits at the Hofberg Sculpture Museum in Landshut.

References

External links

 Catalog raisonné of Fritz Koenigs artwork (by Freundeskreis Fritz Koenig e.V.)
 
 

1924 births
2017 deaths
German sculptors
German male sculptors
Modern sculptors
Commanders Crosses of the Order of Merit of the Federal Republic of Germany
Academic staff of the Technical University of Munich
German military personnel of World War II
Deaths in Germany